Shrimp Curry, also known as prawn curry, is a typical curry dish of Burmese cuisine, Indonesian cuisine in Indonesia (Aceh and West Sumatra), Indo-Portuguese cuisine in India (Goa) and Portugal, Mozambican cuisine in Mozambique and Thai cuisine in Thailand (Phuket).

As the name suggests, this is a dish prepared with shrimp (locally also referred to as prawn), typically cooked in a thick sauce of a yellow hue. Among other ingredients are grated coconut, turmeric, cumin, coriander, chilli, onion, garlic, tamarind, vinegar, sugar and salt. It is usually accompanied by white rice.

In Burmese cuisine, prawn  is a traditional Burmese curry of whole prawns cooked in a  gravy of aromatics and shrimp oil (ပုစွန်ဆီ), which is similar to tomalley.

In Indonesia, this dish is known and quite popular in Sumatra of Acehnese, Minangkabau and Malay cuisine.

In Portugal, the dish can be found on the menus of Goan and Mozambican restaurants.

See also 
 Caril de camarão com quiabos (shrimp curry with okra) in the Portuguese Wikipedia
 Curry
 List of shrimp dishes

References

Curry
Shrimp dishes
Burmese cuisine
Goan cuisine
Indonesian curries
Mozambican cuisine
Thai curries